The MBCGame StarCraft League, also known as MSL, was a StarCraft tournament hosted by Korean television network MBCGame. The tournament started out in 2002 under the name of KPGA Tour, and in 2003 it was renamed the MSL. On February 1, 2012, MBCGame ceased operations and the MSL was discontinued. Throughout its lifetime, the MSL gave away the equivalent of over US$1.6 million in prize money.

League Championships

Brackets

Note: Brackets are re-seeded according to KeSPA ranking in the quarterfinals.

2009 Avalon MSL

2009 Nate MSL

2010 Hana Daetoo Securities MSL

2010 Bigfile MSL

2010 PDPop MSL

2011 ABC Mart MSL

See also
StarCraft professional competition
Starleague (Ongamenet)

References

External links
Avalon MSL Results

StarCraft competitions
Esports competitions in South Korea
2002 establishments in South Korea
2012 disestablishments in South Korea